The men's triple jump event at the 2020 Summer Olympics took place between 3 and 5 August 2021 at the Japan National Stadium. Approximately 35 athletes were expected to compete; the exact number was dependent on how many nations use universality places to enter athletes in addition to the 32 qualifying through time or ranking (2 universality places were used in 2016). 32 athletes from 19 nations competed. Pedro Pichardo of Portugal won the gold medal, the nation's second victory in the men's triple jump (after Nelson Évora in 2008). China's Zhu Yaming took silver, while Hugues Fabrice Zango earned Burkina Faso's first Olympic medal in any event.

Summary
Absent was the defending champion Christian Taylor of the U.S., #2 jumper of all time due to injury and bronze medalist Dong Bin, the field returned the silver medalist, #3 of all time Will Claye, #5 of all time Pedro Pichardo and just 4 months after setting the indoor world record, Hugues Fabrice Zango the world leader.  All had jumped over 18 metres. Taylor and Claye had also been gold and silver at the most recent World Championships, with Zango as the bronze medalist.  Since the previous Olympics in April 2018, Pichardo had defected from Cuba and was now jumping for Portugal.

Four athletes managed to exceed 17 metres in the first round, Claye was first down the runway with a 17.19m.  Five jumpers later, Pichardo established himself as the leader with 17.61m, Donald Scott moved onto the podium with a 17.15m, then Yasser Triki moved into second at 17.30m, breaking his own Algerian national record.  Of the jumpers with a legal first attempt, Zango found himself in dead last place with at 15.91m.  Leading off the second round, Claye landed his feet somewhere close to Pichardo's mark but dropped his elbow further back.  He turned around to find that effort was a foul. A couple of jumps later, Zhu Yaming landed in the same area for 17.41m, to move into second place. Pichardo duplicated his 17.61m and Triki produced a second national record 17.42m to take back his position. With a 16.83m, Zango improved but still found himself in 9th place, in danger of being eliminated before the final three jumps.

Claye led off the third round with a 17.44m to move back into a podium position. Pichardo expanded his lead with a Portuguese national record . Knowing he had hit a big one (equalling the #17 jump of all time), Pichardo posed and held up a fist while still lying in the pit. Under pressure, Zango gritted his teeth and pounded out a 17.47m bursting the bubble and moving into second place. 

Nobody was able to improve through the finals except in the fifth round when Zhu jumped 17.57m to put himself into the silver medal. Triki's third national record of the competition, 17.43m couldn't move him back to the podium.

Background
This was the 29th appearance of the event, which is one of 12 athletics events to have been held at every Summer Olympics.

No nations made their men's triple jump debut. The United States competed for the 28th time, having missed only the boycotted 1980 Games.

Qualification

A National Olympic Committee (NOC) could enter up to 3 qualified athletes in the men's triple jump event if all athletes meet the entry standard or qualify by ranking during the qualifying period. (The limit of 3 has been in place since the 1930 Olympic Congress.) The qualifying standard is 17.14 metres. This standard was "set for the sole purpose of qualifying athletes with exceptional performances unable to qualify through the IAAF World Rankings pathway." The world rankings, based on the average of the best five results for the athlete over the qualifying period and weighted by the importance of the meet, will then be used to qualify athletes until the cap of 32 is reached.

The qualifying period was originally from 1 May 2019 to 29 June 2020. Due to the COVID-19 pandemic, the period was suspended from 6 April 2020 to 30 November 2020, with the end date extended to 29 June 2021. The world rankings period start date was also changed from 1 May 2019 to 30 June 2020; athletes who had met the qualifying standard during that time were still qualified, but those using world rankings would not be able to count performances during that time. The qualifying time standards could be obtained in various meets during the given period that have the approval of the IAAF. Both outdoor and indoor meets are eligible. The most recent Area Championships may be counted in the ranking, even if not during the qualifying period.

NOCs can also use their universality place—each NOC can enter one male athlete regardless of time if they had no male athletes meeting the entry standard for an athletics event—in the triple jump.

Entry number: 32.

Competition format
The 2020 competition continued to use the two-round format with divided final introduced in 1936. The qualifying round gave each competitor three jumps to achieve a qualifying distance (not yet set; 2016 used 16.95 metres); if fewer than 12 men did so, the top 12 (including all those tied) would advance. The final provided each jumper with three jumps; the top eight jumpers received an additional three jumps for a total of six, with the best to count (qualifying round jumps were not considered for the final).

Records
Prior to this competition, the existing world, Olympic, and area records were as follows.

The following national records were set during this competition:

Schedule
All times are Japan Standard Time (UTC+9)

The men's triple jump took place over two separate days.

Results

Qualification
Qualification Rules: Qualifying performance 17.05 (Q) or at least 12 best performers (q) advance to the Final.

Final

References

Men's triple jump
2020
Men's events at the 2020 Summer Olympics